During the 2007–08 German football season, TSG 1899 Hoffenheim competed in the 2. Bundesliga.

Season summary
Hoffenheim's first ever season in the 2. Bundesliga saw them promoted to the Bundesliga for the first time, as runners-up.

First-team squad
Squad at end of season

Left club during season

Competitions

Overview

2. Bundesliga

League table

Results summary

Results by round

References

Notes

TSG 1899 Hoffenheim
TSG 1899 Hoffenheim seasons